Esteban Piñero Camacho (born 28 February 1981) is a member of the boyband D'NASH. He is known simply as Basty and is the sporty one of the band.

D'Nash 

In 2005 Esteban formed a band named D'Nash with friends Michael Hennet Sotomayor, Francisco Javier Álvarez Colinet and Antonio Martos Ortiz.

Discography

Studio albums
 2006: Capaz de Todo
 2006: Capaz de Todo - Edicion Especial
 2007: Capaz de Todo - Misión Eurovisión
 2007–2008: Todo Va a Cambiar
 2011: Garabatos

External links 
 Official D'Nash Website
 Official Website

1981 births
Living people
People from Cádiz
Eurovision Song Contest entrants for Spain
Eurovision Song Contest entrants of 2007
21st-century Spanish singers
21st-century Spanish male singers